Ahmed Djebbar (born 1941) is an academic and the Algerian minister for education in the 1992 government of Belaid Abdessalam.

References

Algerian politicians
Living people
1941 births
Place of birth missing (living people)
21st-century Algerian people
Date of birth missing (living people)